Trawsnant is a hamlet in the  community of Llanrhystud, Ceredigion, Wales, which is 67.8 miles (109.1 km) from Cardiff and 177.5 miles (285.7 km) from London. Trawsnant is represented in the Senedd by Elin Jones (Plaid Cymru) and is part of the Ceredigion constituency in the House of Commons.

See also
 List of localities in Wales by population

References

Villages in Ceredigion